was a Japanese athlete who competed mainly in the pole vault. He won a bronze medal at the 1936 Summer Olympics held in Berlin, Germany, tying with his teammate Shuhei Nishida. When the two declined to compete against each other to decide a winner, Nishida was awarded the silver after a decision of the Japanese team, on the basis that Nishida had cleared the height in fewer attempts. The competition was featured in a scene in the documentary Olympia, filmed by Leni Riefenstahl. On their return to Japan, Nishida and Ōe had their Olympic medals cut in half, and had a jeweler splice together two new “friendship medals”, half in bronze and half in silver.

In 1937 Ōe set a national record at 4 m 35 cm that stood for 21 years. In 1939 he joined the Imperial Japanese Army and was killed in action in Luzon on December 24, 1941.

References

1914 births
1941 deaths
Japanese military personnel killed in World War II
Japanese male pole vaulters
Olympic male pole vaulters
Olympic athletes of Japan
Olympic bronze medalists for Japan
Olympic bronze medalists in athletics (track and field)
Athletes (track and field) at the 1936 Summer Olympics
Medalists at the 1936 Summer Olympics
Japan Championships in Athletics winners
Imperial Japanese Army personnel of World War II
Imperial Japanese Army officers
20th-century Japanese people